Hobart Chargers is a NBL1 South club based in Hobart, Tasmania. The club fields a team in both the Men's and Women's NBL1 South. The Chargers play their home games at the Derwent Entertainment Centre and Kingborough Sports Centre.

Club history

Early years
In 1981, the Hobart Hornets entered the South Eastern Basketball League (SEBL) for the league's inaugural season. After two seasons in the SEBL, the team withdrew from the league due to the introduction of the Hobart Devils in the National Basketball League in 1983. The Hornets re-entered the SEBL, now known as the SEABL, in 1990. Between 1990 and 1996, Hobart had seven straight seasons of missing the playoffs under coaches Denis Hyland (1990–91; 1993–95), Danny Adamson (1992), and Ross Park (1996).

Success of the Chargers
The Chargers name was born in 1997 after the demise of the Hobart Devils. The Chargers immediately saw success as they won back-to-back CBA South Conference championships in 1997 and 1998. In 2000 and 2002, they not only won their third and fourth South Conference titles, but were successful in claiming National Championship honours in both years. During this period, a Hobart Chargers women's team had an unsuccessful five-year run between 1998 and 2002, as they failed to make a playoff berth in that time.

The Chargers' inaugural coach, Mark Chivers, ended his 11-year tenure following the 2007 season. In 2008, Dan Krebs took over as coach of the Chargers and guided them to their fifth South Conference title. They went on to win the overall SEABL championship after defeating East Conference champions, the Knox Raiders, in a contest that earned the winning team a semi-finals place in the Australian Club Championships. In the ACC semi-finals, the Chargers defeated the Melbourne Tigers 128–126 to move on to the grand final. There they were defeated 103–99 by the Rockhampton Rockets to finish as national runners-up. Despite his successful season with the Chargers, Krebs was replaced as coach in 2009 with former NBL player Anthony Stewart.

In 2010, the Lady Chargers re-entered the league. In 2014, they made their way through to their first ever conference final.

New era of Hobart basketball
In September 2016, former Tasmanian Labor premier, David Bartlett, was appointed president of the Chargers. Bartlett's immediate aim was to have the club be "NBL ready" in three years. He also set his sights on having both the men and women play in three finals series and win at least one championship over those three years, and acquire a new home venue for the club – for more than a decade, the Chargers had played at the Hobart Netball and Sports Centre, but were forced to train at New Town High and Warrane Stadium because the centre was not available during the week. Although the men's team bounced back from two years in the playoff wilderness to reach the South Conference final in 2016, the club still had numerous issues off the court at the time of Bartlett's appointment, including being $120,000 in debt. Financial problems almost resulted in the men's team being booted from the 2016 SEABL playoffs, while questions remained about the financial security of the women's program.

In November 2016, David Bartlett boldly declared his long-term vision of averaging 3,000 fans for SEABL matches after securing a deal which saw basketball in Hobart return to its spiritual home. After nearly two months of negotiations with the Glenorchy City Council – and having landed a third major sponsor in Schweppes – the Chargers announced that they would play home SEABL contests at the Derwent Entertainment Centre from 2017 onwards. Bartlett's next goal was to update the club to a new look by refreshing their brand within the southern basketball community. With the help of Chargers members, supporters and basketball fans, a new logo and playing strip was introduced for the 2017 season.

In October 2017, Bartlett declared a Tasmanian NBL side could be competitive with a yearly budget of $5 million.

In August 2018, the men's team won the SEABL championship. Around that time, plans to get the Chargers into the NBL morphed into an overarching Tasmanian bid for a proposed new club to be called Southern Huskies. The SEABL was disbanded following the 2018 season and was replaced by NBL1, of which the Chargers chose not to compete in.

On 30 September 2019, following the demise of the Southern Huskies, the Chargers submitted an application for entry into the 2020 NBL1 season. On 19 October 2019, they were granted entry into NBL1. Later that month, Bartlett stepped down as president of the Chargers. The NBL1 South season did not go ahead in 2020 due to the COVID-19 pandemic.

In 2022, the men's team won the NBL1 South Grand Final to claim the championship.

References

External links
 Chargers' official website

South East Australian Basketball League teams
Basketball teams established in 1981
Basketball teams in Tasmania
Sport in Hobart